BECU is a credit union originally established to serve employees of The Boeing Company. BECU was founded as Fellowship Credit Union in 1935 by 18 Boeing employees, and was named Boeing Employees' Credit Union for much of its history. Its headquarters are located in Tukwila, Washington. As of December 2021, BECU had over $30.2 billion in assets  and over 1.3 million members as of December 2021, making it the largest credit union in Washington and fourth largest in the United States. Beverly Anderson is the current President and CEO.

BECU has over 52 locations throughout the Puget Sound region, three locations in Spokane, and two branches in North Charleston, South Carolina.

Originally, BECU was only open to past and present employees of the Boeing Company, its subsidiaries or affiliates, BECU itself, and the Museum of Flight. In 2002, membership was opened to those who live, work, go to school, or worship in Washington state and their family members.

On November 2, 2017, BECU changed its logo, replacing the 'cursive E' logo that had been used by the organization since the late 1980s, with a sans-serif logo.

References

External links

Credit unions based in Washington (state)
Boeing Employees' Credit Union
Privately held companies of the United States
1935 establishments in Washington (state)
Banks established in 1935
Companies based in Tukwila, Washington